In the run-up to the 2019 Austrian legislative election, various organisations carry out opinion polling to gauge voting intentions in Austria. Results of such polls are displayed in this list.

The date range for these opinion polls are from the previous legislative election, held on 15 October 2017, to the 2019 election, held on 29 September.

Graphical summary

Poll results

Preferred Chancellor

Preferred coalition

See also 
Opinion polling for the 2017 Austrian legislative election

External links 
neuwal.com 
Twitter: @Wahlen_AT 

Next